M. K. Shivananjappa (1921-1967) was an Indian politician. He was elected to the Lok Sabha, lower house of the Parliament of India from Mandya, Karnataka as a member of the Indian National Congress, in 1952, 1957, 1962, 1967.

Early life and education 
M K Shivananjappa was born on July 5, 1921 to Kempe Gowda and Shrimati Leelavathi. He studied at Intermediate College, Bangalore and later at Maharaja's College, Mysore & Law College, Pune.

References

External links
Official biographical sketch in Parliament of India website

Indian National Congress politicians
1921 births
1967 deaths
Indian National Congress politicians from Karnataka